The Women's 800m Freestyle event at the 2006 Central American and Caribbean Games occurred on Monday, July 17, 2006, at the S.U. Pedro de Heredia Aquatic Complex in Cartagena, Colombia. It was the first swimming event of the Games.

Records at the start of the event were:
World Record (WR): 8:16.22, Janet Evans (USA), Tokyo, Japan, August 20, 1989
CAC Record (CR): 8:52.57, Carolyn Adel (Suriname), 1998 Games in Maracaibo, Venezuela, August 9, 1998

Results
(Time Final)

References

Freestyle, Women's 800m
2006 in women's swimming